Helium-3 nuclear magnetic resonance (3He-NMR) is an analytical technique used to identify helium-containing compounds. Because a helium atom, or even two helium atoms, can be encased in fullerene-like cages, the nuclear magnetic resonance spectroscopy of this element can be a sensitive probe for changes of the carbon framework around it. Using carbon-13 NMR to analyze fullerenes themselves is complicated by so many subtle differences among the carbons in anything but the simplest, highly-symmetric structures. The technique is limited by the need to use the rare helium-3 isotope: the vast majority of naturally occurring helium is helium-4, which does not have suitable magnetic properties for NMR detection.

References 

Nuclear magnetic resonance
Helium